Bere Ferrers station on the Tamar Valley Line is situated near the village of Bere Ferrers in Devon, England. The station is on the former Southern main line between Exeter and  via . It is currently operated by Great Western Railway (GWR).

History

The station was originally called Beer Ferris after the local Beer family who owned several nearby villages. However, in 1897, the railway authorities of the time decided that this name promoted an unrefined image of the village due to the association with beer, and therefore changed the name to Bere Ferrers. The original spelling can still be seen on the sign on the signal box in the heritage centre.

The station was host to a Southern Railway camping coach from 1936 to 1939. A camping coach was also positioned here by the Southern Region from 1954 to 1959, and two coaches from 1960 to 1964.

Through services from Lydford were withdrawn on 6 May 1968 and the line was reduced to a single track on 7 September 1970.

Accidents and incidents 

The station was the scene of a fatal railway accident on 24 September 1917. Ten soldiers from New Zealand were being transported from Plymouth to Salisbury following their arrival in Britain. At Bere Ferrers station they alighted from their troop train for a brief rest (on the wrong side of the train, between the tracks) and, being unaccustomed to British railways, were struck and killed by an oncoming express. The men are buried in a Plymouth war cemetery, and a plaque was unveiled in 2001 in their memory in the village centre.

Services
Connections with main line services can be made at Plymouth, although a small number of Tamar Valley services continue beyond Plymouth.

Heritage Centre
The sidings alongside the station form the Tamar Belle Heritage Centre. This includes some old carriages which are used as a restaurant and as camping coaches.  The LSWR signal box was erected here in 1989/90 but was formerly at Pinhoe railway station on the outskirts of Exeter.

Community railway
The railway from Plymouth to Gunnislake is designated as a community railway and is supported by marketing provided by the Devon and Cornwall Rail Partnership.  The line is promoted under the "Tamar Valley Line" name.

The Olde Plough Inn takes part in the Tamar Valley Line rail ale trail, which is designed to promote the use of the line. The line is also part of the Dartmoor Sunday Rover network of integrated bus and rail routes.

See also
Exeter to Plymouth railway of the LSWR

References

Bibliography

Further reading
 
 
 Devon and Cornwall Rail Partnership (2006), Tamar Valley Line Rail Ale Trail

External links
 The Tamar Belle, a visitor centre based in the old station building.

Railway stations in Devon
Former Plymouth, Devonport and South Western Junction Railway stations
Railway stations in Great Britain opened in 1890
Railway stations served by Great Western Railway
Railway museums in England
Museums in Devon
Bere Ferrers
DfT Category F2 stations